Brierley Hill can refer to the following:
 Brierley Hill, a town in England
 Brierley Hill Urban District, a former administrative municipality in England
 , a vessel utilised by the Hudson's Bay Company